DYCM (1152 AM) Bag-ong Adlaw is a radio station owned and operated by Makati Broadcasting Company. Its main studio is located at the Room 201, 2/F Dona Luisa Bldg., Fuente Osmena, Cebu City, and transmitter is located at Brgy. Tayud, Consolacion, Cebu.

History
DYCM was founded in 1989 as "Kaabag sa Banikanhon Kaugmaran", then "Kaabag sa Serbisyo" and "Bag-ong Adlaw - Cebu Del Norte", under the ownership of Masbate Community Broadcasting Corporation. It was formerly located at Brgy. Taytayan, Bogo, Cebu. In early 2014, it went off the air and its ownership was transferred to Makati Broadcasting Company, a media outlet owned by former Bogo Mayor Celestino Martinez. DYCM was relaunched on July 8, 2014, this time in Cebu City, along with its relay station in its old location. In December 2020, the station ceased its broadcast on AM.

References

Radio stations in Metro Cebu
Radio stations in Cebu
Radio stations established in 1989